The 2016 FIBA Intercontinental Cup was the 26th edition of the FIBA Intercontinental Cup. The game was contested by the 2016 FIBA Americas League champions (the top-tier level of Latin America champions), Guaros de Lara, and the 2015–16 FIBA Europe Cup champions, Fraport Skyliners, who at the time were the 3rd-tier level champions of Europe (FIBA Europe Cup is currently Europe's 4th-tier level league). The champions of the 2015–16 EuroLeague, who would normally represent Europe in the FIBA Intercontinental Cup (EuroLeague is the top-tier level European-wide-league), CSKA Moscow, did not participate in the tournament, as a result of the 2015–17 FIBA–Euroleague Basketball controversy.

The 2016 FIBA Intercontinental Cup was played with a single-game format, in Frankfurt, on 18 September 2016.

Qualified teams

Venue
When the event was announced, it was also announced that the game would be played in the Fraport Arena, the home arena of the Skyliners. Fraport Arena is an arena in Frankfurt, Germany. It is primarily used for basketball, and it is the home arena of Fraport Skyliners. The arena opened in 1986, and it has a seating capacity of 5,002 people. It also hosts the annual indoor football tournament, with six teams from the region, such as Eintracht Frankfurt and Kickers Offenbach.

Match details
The game was close for the most part of it, but in the end, Guaros proved to be too much for the Skyliners. In the game's final minute, Zach Graham hit a lay-up, and that was followed by a Heissler Guillent three pointer, which sealed the victory for Guaros. Zach Graham, who scored 19 points in the game, was named the FIBA Intercontinental Cup Most Valuable Player.

MVP

 Zach Graham - ( Guaros de Lara)

References

External links
2016 Intercontinental Basketball Cup
FIBA official website
2016 FIBA Intercontinental Cup at FIBA Archive

2016
2016 in basketball
2016–17 in German basketball
2016–17 in South American basketball
International basketball competitions hosted by Germany